Nils Gustaf Daniel Romander (3 July 1893 – 1 October 1978) was a Swedish sport shooter who competed in the 1912 Summer Olympics, finishing fifth in the 300 metre military rifle, three positions competition.

References

1893 births
1978 deaths
Swedish male sport shooters
ISSF rifle shooters
Olympic shooters of Sweden
Shooters at the 1912 Summer Olympics
Sportspeople from Halland County